IFP may refer to:

Film
 Ian Fleming Publications, a film production company formerly known as both Glidrose Productions Limited and Glidrose Publications Limited
 Independent Filmmaker Project, a series of membership-based, not-for-profit organizations that produce programs that assist independent filmmakers
 India Film Project, Asia's largest content festival based out of India

Research and education
 IFP School (Institute of French Petroleum), a graduate engineering school near Paris, France
 Institut français de Pondichéry, the French Institute of Pondicherry
 Institut français du pétrole, the French Institute of Petroleum, a public petroleum and oil research organisation in France

Sports
 International Federation of Pickleball, the highest governing body of pickleball
 International Federation of Poker, a non-profit governing body for poker

Other
 IFP, IATA airport code for Laughlin/Bullhead International Airport, Arizona, US
 IFP-1, intermediate filament protein, a non-essential protein in Caenorhabditis elegans
 In forma pauperis, a designation for indigent parties in court
 Inkatha Freedom Party, a South African political party